Nallur (Nalloor) is a panchayat town in Kanniyakumari district in the Indian state of Tamil Nadu.

Nalloor Town Panchayat city in district of Kanniyakumari, Tamil Nadu. The Nalloor city is divided into 18 wards for which elections are held every 5 years.

Geography
Nallur is located at

Demographics
 India census, Nallur had a population of 15,563. Males constitute 50% of the population and females 50%. Nallur has an average literacy rate of 78%, higher than the national average of 59.5%: male literacy is 82%, and female literacy is 74%. In Nallur, 11% of the population is under 6 years of age.

As of 2011 census, Nalloor Town Panchayat has population of 17,989 of which 8,985 are males while 9,004 are females as per report released by Census India 2011.

Population of Children with age of 0-6 is 1721 which is 9.57% of total population of Nalloor (TP). In Nalloor Town Panchayat, Female Sex Ratio is of 1002 against state average of 996. Moreover, Child Sex Ratio in Nalloor is around 921 compared to Tamil Nadu state average of 943. Literacy rate of Nalloor city is 92.35% higher than state average of 80.09%. In Nalloor, Male literacy is around 94.97% while female literacy rate is 89.77%.

Nalloor Town Panchayat has total administration over 4,480 houses to which it supplies basic amenities like water and sewerage. It is also authorized to build roads within Town Panchayat limits and impose taxes on properties coming under its jurisdiction.

Religion

See also

 Karavilai
 Kuzhithurai Railway Station
 Marthandam

References

Cities and towns in Kanyakumari district